Twister Falls (also known as Crossover Falls, Crisscross Falls, Bowtie Falls, and Eagle Creek Falls) is a prominent waterfall that is formed as Eagle Creek cascades  into a narrow canyon and forms two streams that appear to "twist" around each other, hence the name "twister". The falls begin with a small sliding cascade that drops  over a rocky slope into a pool, followed by some rapids. The next tier is the twisting tier, which plunges . Before this point, a small portion of the stream splits off and makes a sheer plunge of approximately equal height down the canyon.

Name
The waterfall has not been named by the USGS, but has been called Twister Falls for its unusual nature.

See also
List of waterfalls on Eagle Creek and its tributaries

References

Waterfalls of Hood River County, Oregon
Waterfalls of Oregon
Mount Hood National Forest